The 2020–21 Cal State Fullerton Titans men's basketball team represented California State University, Fullerton in the 2020–21 NCAA Division I men's basketball season. The Titans, led by eighth-year head coach Dedrique Taylor, played their home games at Titan Gym as members of the Big West Conference.

Previous season 

The Titans finished the 2019–20 season 11–20 overall, 6–10 in Big West Conference play to finish tied for 7th in the conference standings. A 7th seed in the Big West Conference tournament, the tournament was cancelled due to the COVID-19 pandemic, ending the Titans season.

Roster

Schedule and results 

|-
!colspan=9 style=| Non-conference regular season

|-
!colspan=9 style=| Big West regular season

Source:

References 

Cal State Fullerton Titans men's basketball seasons
Cal State Fullerton
Cal State Fullerton
Cal State Fullerton